Tomis may refer to:
 The historical Ancient Greek name of Constanța, a city in Romania
 Tomis (spider), a genus of jumping spiders
 C.S. Volei 2004 Tomis Constanța, female volleyball club from Constanța, Romania
 C.V.M. Tomis Constanța, male volleyball club from Constanța, Romania
 Tomis (castra), a fort in the Roman province of Moesia